Forbes Elliott Godfrey (March 31, 1867 – January 6, 1932) was an Ontario physician and political figure. He represented York West in the Legislative Assembly of Ontario as a Conservative member from 1907 to 1932.

Background
He was born in Monck Township, the son of Methodist Minister Robert Godfrey. Godfrey was educated at the University of Toronto and the University of Edinburgh. He set up a medical practice with his partner which ran from his house on Albert Avenue in the Town of Mimico. On his death the Town of Mimico observed a day of mourning.

Politics
Godfrey was elected in a 1907 by-election held after the death of Joseph Wesley St. John. He served as Minister of Labour from 1923 to 1930 and Minister of Health from 1924 to 1930.

Cabinet positions

References

External links 

1867 births
1932 deaths
19th-century Methodists
Canadian Methodists
Members of the Executive Council of Ontario
Progressive Conservative Party of Ontario MPPs